The  is a  railway line in Adachi, Tokyo, Japan, owned and operated by the private railway operator Tobu Railway. It connects Nishiarai Station to Daishimae Station.

As fare collection and ticket purchases are conducted at Nishiarai, excluding those with a commuter pass or special ticket, passengers are able to board the train from Daishimae without a valid ticket.

Stations

History
The line opened on December 20, 1931, as the Tobu Nishi-Ita Line from Nishiarai to Daishimae, with a total distance of 1.1 km. This line forms part of the proposed  which was never completed. The Tobu Nishi-Ita Line was intended to link the Tobu Isesaki Line and Tobu Tojo Line after the merger of Tobu Railways and Tojo Railways in 1920 to allow for efficient transfer of rolling stock, and to improve the service for residents along the line. The plan was to connect Nishiarai Station to Kami-Itabashi Station, hence the name Nishi-Ita Line. 

There were multiple reasons for the cancelation of the line. The Great Kanto Earthquake occurred in 1923, which was between the time of applying for and granting of the railway license. As such priority was given to the restoration of existing lines. The Arakawa River flood drainage canal was still under construction which meant the design of the railway bridge could not be finalized. The issue of the high cost of constructing bridges over the Arakawa and Sumida Rivers. Problems arising from requests for rerouting from town officials in the proposed area, and the rapid urbanization of the area around the proposed route meant the line would have been very expensive to construct, and the probability of turning a profit was low. One year after the opening of the line in 1932, the construction plan between Shikahama to Kami-Itabashi was abandoned. As for the construction between Daishimae to Shikihama, a proposal for the extension of the construction timeframe was submitted to the government but was rejected in June of 1937, and the railway license expired after.

Operation was suspended from May 20, 1945. Operations resumed from May 21, 1947, with the line renamed Tobu Daishi Line.

On December 1, 1968, Daishimae station was relocated due to road extension, shortening the line by 100 m. On July 26, 1991, the track was elevated.

Wanman driver-only operation started on March 19, 2003.

From 17 March 2012, station numbering was introduced on all Tobu lines. Tobu Daishi Line stations were numbered prefixed with the letters "TS".

As the plan for the Nishi-Ita Line was abandoned, rolling stock transfers between the Tobu Tojo Line and the Tobu Isesaki Line are conducted through the Chichibu Main Line.

References

External links
 
 Tobu Railway Daishi Line information page 

 
Daishi Line
Railway lines in Tokyo
1067 mm gauge railways in Japan
Railway lines opened in 1931